Route 374 is a collector road in the Canadian province of Nova Scotia. It connects New Glasgow at Exit 24 of Nova Scotia Highway 104 with Sheet Harbour at Trunk 7. The highway runs through the Halifax Regional Municipality, Guysborough County & Pictou County.

The highway runs north-south through the Liscomb Game Sanctuary.

Route description
Route 374 begins in Downtown New Glasgow at the junction with Route 289, then runs south to Stellarton, where it passes under Hwy. 104, which is part of the Trans-Canada Highway network. Then, the route continues south through Hopewell and Lorne. Route 374 continues south through Trafalgar, Lochaber Mines and Malay Falls, to its southern terminus in with Trunk 7 in Sheet Harbour.

Communities 

New Glasgow
Stellarton
Riverton
Eureka
Hopewell
Lorne

Trafalgar
Liscomb Game Sanctuary
Lochaber Mines
Malay Falls
Sheet Harbour

See also

List of Nova Scotia provincial highways

References

374
374
374
374
Transport in New Glasgow, Nova Scotia